Lorenza Correa (1773–1831) was a Spanish stage actress and opera singer. She had a successful national and international career in Spain, France and Italy in the period 1790-1810 which made her famous in her time.

She was born in 1773 in Málaga.

In 1786 she began to work in Barcelona, and in the next year, was the eleventh lady in the company of Martínez. She was engaged by the company of Martínez at the two Royal Theatres in Madrid, Teatro de la Cruz and Teatro del Príncipe, between 1787 and 1804. In 1788 she stood out as singer. She participated in a number of important productions.

In 1804, she left Spain after a conflict with the royal theatre directory and left for Paris, where she hade great success. She spent the rest of her career successfully touring in the cities of Italy, particularly in Milan.

Her death date is uncertain.

References

Bibliography

 

1773 births
1831 deaths
18th-century Spanish actresses
19th-century Spanish actresses
18th-century women singers
19th-century Spanish women opera singers
18th-century Spanish opera singers